LeftLion is a printed and online culture and listings magazine which covers Nottingham.

It was originally set up by three childhood friends, Jared Wilson, Alan Gilby and Tim Bates, and launched as a website on 1 September 2003. The first issue of the printed magazine came out a year later in Autumn 2004. The printed magazine was published bi-monthly from 2004-2014. Then, following a successful crowdfunding campaign on Kickstarter they raised the funds to publish the magazine monthly, which it has done ever since. The online magazine is updated daily.

The publication takes its name from a stone lion in Nottingham's Old Market Square, which since Nottingham Council House was built in the 1920s has served as a meeting point for people in Nottingham City Centre.

Contributors
LeftLion is put together by a range of creatives who all either live in or have links to the city of Nottingham. Most of these contribute on a voluntary basis.

Contributors have included Al Needham, actor Paul Kaye, Miles Hunt (lead singer of The Wonder Stuff), Nicola Monaghan, Tom Hathaway (author of Full Bacon Jacket), Rob Cutforth (award-winning Canadian blogger), Wayne Burrows, Ash Dilks, Jennie Syson, Andrew 'MulletProofPoet' Graves, Nathan Miller and Roger Mean.

The current editorial team consists of Bridie Squires, Jared Wilson, LP Mills, Aly Stoneman, Ashley Carter, Emily Thursfield, Alex Kuster, Anna Murphy, and Gemma Fenyn. Previous editors have included Alison Emm, Al Needham, and Jared Wilson.

The magazine's artistic team is run by Alan Gilby and Natalie Owen, and features regular contributions from Raphael Achache, Si Mitchell, Rob White, Rikki Marr, and Dominic Murray. Cover artists in 2013 included Jon Burgerman and Jon Blanche.

Interviewees
People who have been interviewed in the pages of their magazine include Derren Brown, Alan Moore, Public Enemy, Paul Smith, The Prodigy, Juliette Lewis, Roots Manuva, Dizzee Rascal, David Nobbs, Noel Fielding, Ed Byrne, Shane Meadows, Jonathan Glazer, Klaxons, Jon McGregor, Alex Hales, Alice Oswald, Alexei Sayle, Sir Andrew Motion, Alan Sillitoe and The Sheriff of Nottingham.

They were the only media organisation who ever interviewed Frank Robinson and the last publication to interview Nottingham author Alan Sillitoe and journalist Ray Gosling.

Awards and press
In late 2006 and 2007, LeftLion was nominated for a series of awards including Best Free Music Magazine by Record of the Day, Ambassadors of Nottingham by BBC Radio Nottingham. The Nottingham Evening Post referred to them as "the high priests of Nottingham culture".

In 2009, LeftLion won the 'Writing and Publishing' award at the Nottingham Creative Business Awards, in a ceremony held at the Nottingham Council House on 7 October 2009. They were also runners-up for the award of Creative Business of the Year.

In 2012 The Guardian cited LeftLion as being partially responsible for an "artistic boom" in Nottingham in an interview with Game of Thrones actor Joe Dempsie who also said: "It's a great paper. It's played a massive part in Nottingham's sense of creative identity right now."

In 2013, the publication celebrated its tenth anniversary with BBC's East Midlands Today running a feature interview, and BBC Online running a photo gallery.

In 2018 LeftLion celebrated their fifteenth birthday by releasing their 100th printed issue and then a book titled LeftLion: 100 Covers, which gathered together the cover artwork from their back catalogue.

Events
LeftLion also sponsors free music nights at venues in the city featuring bands from the area, a weekly pub quiz and has produced a series of podcasts and live literature events. During 2006 LeftLion worked with "A Drop In The Ocean", a citywide music festival that raised £27,200 for charity.

Musical acts and artists that have played at LeftLion events include Liam Bailey, Jake Bugg, Thepetebox, Natalie Duncan, Amusement Parks on Fire, Thepetebox, Lightspeed Champion, The Hellset Orchestra, Love Ends Disaster!, Rapunzel MAP, Bent, Crazy Penis, The Smears, Alice Rock, Model Morning, Old Basford, The Elementz, Cappo, The Deltarays and Kids In Tracksuits.

References

External links
LeftLion Extravaganza BBC Review
Ambassadors of Nottingham nomination by the BBC

Visual arts magazines published in the United Kingdom
Bi-monthly magazines published in the United Kingdom
Cultural magazines published in the United Kingdom
Magazines established in 2003
Mass media in Nottingham